Carl Anthony Falk-Gramer (née Falk; born 17 August 1980 in Stockholm), is a Swedish songwriter, record producer and musician and has worked with artists such as Demi Lovato, One Direction, 5 Seconds of Summer, Nicki Minaj, Ellie Goulding, Madonna, Avicii, Ariana Grande, Charlie Puth, Jason Derulo, Westlife, Hilary Duff, Iggy Azalea, Liam Payne.

Biography

As a student Falk attended the Adolf Fredrik's Music School in Stockholm. He then joined "The Location" in 2002, a new production and publishing-company formed by former Cheiron-members Kristian Lundin, Andreas Carlsson and Jake Schulz, leasing the former Cheiron Studios.

Falk left "The Location" in 2007 and re-located to Los Angeles in April 2010 to team up with Rami Yacoub and Steve Angello (Swedish House Mafia). Back in Sweden Carl and Rami started their production company and studio – Kinglet Studios.

Since 2010 he has co-written and co-produced hits like "What Makes You Beautiful", "One Thing", "Live While We're Young", "Kiss You" by One Direction and "Starships" and "Pound The Alarm" by Nicki Minaj. In 2012 Carl was listed as No. 4 on Music Week Top 100 Songwriters of the year based on the UK's 100 biggest selling singles of the year. The same year "Starships" also made US Billboard history, by both debuting in and spending a total of 21 consecutive weeks in the US Top Ten, passing The Black Eyed Peas's single "I Gotta Feeling". As of February 2013, it has sold 7.2 million digital downloads worldwide. Subsequently, he received two ASCAP awards for most performed songs of 2012: "Starships" and "What Makes You Beautiful".

Falk worked with Demi Lovato writing "Shouldn't Come Back" and "Really Don't Care" for her 2013 album "Demi". He also worked on "Rest Of Our Life" for Jason Derulo and "Red Lights" for Tiesto. Falk reached further success in 2014 when he worked with David Guetta on the hit single "One Last Time" for Ariana Grande, reaching no.13 on the Billboard's Hot 100 chart.

In 2015 Falk wrote songs like "Broken Arrows" and "Sunset Jesus" for Avicii, "Rest Your Love" for The Vamps, "Your Type" for Carly Rae Jepsen, "Lost & Found" for Ellie Goulding and "Devil Pray" For Madonna.

His favourite instrument is the guitar as he tries to "always have guitar on my songs, almost like a trademark". Carl can also play multiple other instruments like bass, piano, violin and drums, which he started to learn from an early age on during his childhood. In 2013 Falk won the STIM Platinum guitar prize.

Songwriting Discography

Awards

Falk has won two Ascap Pop Music Awards with the songs "Starships" and "What Makes You Beautiful", amongst many other of awards and nominations. 
Falk received two nominations both in 2012 and in 2013 in the Swedish Music Publishers Awards (SMFF). Both years for Songwriter Of The Year and International Achievement.
He was also nominated for the 2013 Swedish Music Export Award,

References

Living people
1980 births
Swedish record producers
Swedish songwriters
Musicians from Stockholm